Saint John Regional Hospital is a Canadian hospital in Saint John, New Brunswick.

Operated by Horizon Health Network, Saint John Regional Hospital opened in 1982, replacing the Saint John General Hospital and West Saint John Community Hospital facilities, creating the largest single health care facility in the province.

Saint John Regional Hospital is the largest tertiary care referral hospital in New Brunswick and specializes in cardiac (New Brunswick Heart Centre) and trauma care services.

Saint John Regional Hospital is also a teaching hospital for the Faculty of Medicine at Dalhousie University in Halifax, Nova Scotia as well as the 
Faculty of Medicine at Memorial University of Newfoundland in St. John's, Newfoundland and Labrador

It also provides training opportunities for nursing and other health care programs at the University of New Brunswick's Saint John and Fredericton campuses and the New Brunswick Community College.

Services

 Addictions and Mental Health
 Clinical Services
 Cardiac Surgery
 Day Surgery
 Dermatology
 Dialysis (Nephrology)
 Ear, Nose & Throat (Otolaryngology)
 Emergency Department
 Family Medicine
 General Surgery
 Gynecology Surgery
 Gastroenterology
 Geriatrics / Restorative Care
 Infectious Disease
 Intensive Care Unit (ICU)
 Internal Medicine
 Neonatal Intensive Care Unit (NICU)
 Minor Surgery
 Pediatrics
 Palliative Care
 Physiatry
 Plastic and Burns Unit
 Psychiatry
 Obstetrics
 Oncology
 Ophthalmology (Eye) Surgery
 Orthopedic Surgery
 Plastic Surgery
 Rehabilitation
 Rheumatology
 Sleep Centre
 Thoracic Surgery
 Urology Surgery
 Vascular Surgery
 Support and Therapy
 Diagnostics and Testing
 Clinics
 Other Services

References

External links
 Saint John Regional Hospital

Hospital buildings completed in 1982
Hospitals in New Brunswick
Teaching hospitals in Canada
Hospitals established in 1982
Buildings and structures in Saint John, New Brunswick
Heliports in Canada
Certified airports in New Brunswick
1982 establishments in New Brunswick